The 2022 Indiana Secretary of State election took place on November 8, 2022, to elect the next secretary of state of Indiana. Holli Sullivan, a Republican who was appointed to replace Connie Lawson as Secretary of State in 2021, ran for a full term in office but was defeated in the Republican primary by Diego Morales. The Democratic, Republican, and Libertarian parties chose their nominees for Secretary of State at a party convention on June 18, 2022.

Despite Indiana's strong Republican lean, polls showed a competitive race. Republican nominee Diego Morales faced numerous controversies, including: the fact that he was previously fired from a position in the Secretary of State office; his echoing of Donald Trump's false accusations of fraud in the 2020 elections; his use of campaign funds to purchase a $43,000 Toyota RAV4; his description of himself as a "veteran" even though he only served in the military for three months and he was in the Indiana Army National Guard, not the U.S. Armed Forces (the federal definition of a "veteran" only includes the Armed Forces); claims that portions of his resume are exaggerated or misleading; and two accusations of sexual harassment against him. After winning the Republican nomination, he changed his stance on the 2020 presidential election, telling The Washington Post that he believed Biden won legitimately. WTHR commented that Morales received the most negative press of any statewide candidate in Indiana since Richard Mourdock in the 2012 Senate race.

Despite Morales's controversies, he secured a decisive victory over Wells and Maurer. However, he underperformed all other statewide Republican nominees in Indiana by 5-7 percentage points.

Republican convention
Incumbent Secretary of State Connie Lawson resigned in 2021 due to health issues. Governor Eric Holcomb chose state representative Holli Sullivan to replace her, and Sullivan announced she would run for a full term. The Republican primary for Secretary of State was the most expensive in two decades, with challenger Diego Morales leading Sullivan in fundraising. Morales was endorsed by the America First Secretary of State Coalition, a conservative group that supports a slate of candidates in the 2022 United States secretary of state elections.

Candidates

Nominee
Diego Morales, former aide to governor Mike Pence and candidate for Indiana's 4th congressional district in 2018

Eliminated at convention
Paul Hager, perennial candidate
Holli Sullivan, incumbent secretary of state
David Shelton, Knox County clerk

Did not file
Kyle Conrad, Newton County commissioner

Endorsements

Democratic convention

Candidates

Nominee
Destiny Wells, attorney, lieutenant colonel in the U.S. Army Reserve, deputy chair of the Indiana Democratic Party, and former deputy attorney general

Endorsements

Libertarian convention

Nominee
Jeff Maurer, entrepreneur

General election
On October 9, a debate for the Secretary of State election was held by WFYI and the League of Women Voters. Democrat Destiny Wells and Libertarian Jeff Maurer participated in the debate, while Morales skipped it to attend a meeting of the Warrick County Republican Party. Wells and Maurer heavily criticized Morales for not attending the debate. While both agreed that Joe Biden won the 2020 presidential election, Maurer called for an election audit of every Indiana county, while Wells did not. When asked about the problem of low voter turnout, Wells proposed independent redistricting, keeping polling places open longer, and extending the window for early voting as ways to increase turnout, while Maurer blamed the two-party system for creating a lack of competition.

Predictions

Polling

Results

Notes

References

External links
Official campaign websites
Diego Morales (R) for Secretary of State
Jeff Maurer (L) for Secretary of State
Destiny Wells (D) for Secretary of State

Secretary of State
Indiana
Indiana Secretary of State elections